Ludwig may refer to:

People and fictional characters
 Ludwig (given name), including a list of people and fictional characters
 Ludwig (surname), including a list of people
 Ludwig Ahgren, or simply Ludwig, American YouTube live streamer and content creator

Arts and entertainment
 Ludwig (cartoon), a 1977 animated children's series
 Ludwig (film), a 1973 film by Luchino Visconti about Ludwig II of Bavaria
 Ludwig: Requiem for a Virgin King, a 1972 film by Hans-Jürgen Syberberg about Ludwig II of Bavaria
 "Ludwig", a 1967 song by Al Hirt

Other uses
 Ludwig (crater), a small lunar impact crater just beyond the eastern limb of the Moon
 Ludwig, Missouri, an unincorporated community in the United States
 Ludwig Canal, an abandoned canal in southern Germany
 Ludwig Drums, an American manufacturer of musical instruments
 Ludwig (ship), a steamer that sank in 1861 after a collision with the Stadt Zürich

See also
 Ludewig
 Ludvig
 Ludwik
 Ludwick
 Hedwig (disambiguation)